Princess Karoline Mathilde of Schleswig-Holstein-Sonderburg-Glücksburg (Viktoria-Irene Adelheid Auguste Alberta Feodora Karoline Mathilde of Schleswig-Holstein-Sonderburg-Glücksburg; 11 May 1894 – 28 January 1972) was a member of the House of Schleswig-Holstein-Sonderburg-Glücksburg and Princess of Schleswig-Holstein-Sonderburg-Glücksburg by birth and a member of the House of Solms Baruth and Countess of Solms Baruth through her marriage to Count Hans of Solms-Baruth.

Early life
Princess Karoline Mathilde was born on 11 May 1894 at Grünholz Manor, Schleswig-Holstein, Prussia, the sixth and youngest child and fifth and youngest daughter of Frederick Ferdinand, Duke of Schleswig-Holstein-Sonderbug-Glücksburg, and his wife Princess Karoline Mathilde of Schleswig-Holstein-Sonderburg-Augustenburg.

Frederick Ferdinand was the eldest son of Friedrich, Duke of Schleswig-Holstein-Sonderburg-Glücksburg and a nephew of Christian IX of Denmark. Upon the death of his father in 1885, he had succeeded to the headship of the House of Schleswig-Holstein-Sonderburg-Glücksburg and the title of duke. Her eldest sister, Victoria Adelaide, was the consort of Charles Edward, Duke of Saxe-Coburg and Gotha.

Marriage
She married Count Hans of Solms-Baruth on 27 May 1920 at Glücksburg Castle. Count Hans was the third son of Friedrich II, Prince of Solms-Baruth and his wife Countess Luise of Hochberg-Pless and a younger brother of Hereditary Prince Friedrich of Solms Baruth, the husband of Karoline Mathilde's elder sister Adelaide. Solms-Baruth was one of the many minor states of the Holy Roman Empire, located in Lower Lusatia. It had lost its independence in the German Mediatization of 1806.

Karoline Mathilde and Hans had three children:
Countess Viktoria-Luise Frederica Caroline Matildhe of Solms-Baruth (13 March 1921 – 1 March 2003)
Count Friedrich Hans of Solms-Baruth (3 March 1923 – 13 November 2006)
Count Hubertus of Solms-Baruth (7 December 1934 – 22 October 1991)

Later life
In 1942, her daughter Viktoria married her first cousin Prince Friedrich Josias of Saxe-Coburg and Gotha, youngest son of her sister Victoria Adelaide, and later the pretender to the ducal throne of Saxe-Coburg and Gotha. Count Hans died on 9 October 1971 in Salzburg, Austria. Countess Karoline Mathilde died on 28 January 1972, also in Salzburg.

Ancestry

References

External links
Profile of Karoline Mathilde Prinzessin zu Schleswig-Holstein-Sonderburg-Glücksburg, thePeerage.com; accessed 15 August 2014 

1894 births
1972 deaths
Princesses of Schleswig-Holstein-Sonderburg-Glücksburg
People from the Province of Schleswig-Holstein
House of Solms-Baruth